The Diocese of Southwark  is one of the 42 dioceses of the Church of England, part of the worldwide Anglican Communion. The diocese forms part of the Province of Canterbury in England.  It was created on 1 May 1905 from part of the ancient Diocese of Rochester that was served by a suffragan bishop of Southwark (1891–1905).  Before 1877 most of the area was part of the Diocese of Winchester, some being part of the Diocese of London.

Geographical extent
The diocese covers Greater London south of the River Thames (except for the London Borough of Bexley and London Borough of Bromley) and east Surrey. Since the creation of the diocese's episcopal area scheme in 1991 (which before then had been operating informally for the previous five years), the diocese is divided into three episcopal areas, each of which is overseen by an area bishop and contains two archdeaconries:
Croydon Episcopal Area (overseen by the area Bishop of Croydon)
Archdeaconry of Croydon
includes deaneries of Croydon Addington, Croydon Central, Croydon North, Croydon South, and Sutton
Archdeaconry of Reigate
includes deaneries of Caterham, Godstone, and Reigate
Kingston Episcopal Area (overseen by the area Bishop of Kingston)
Archdeaconry of Lambeth
includes deaneries of Brixton, Clapham, Lambeth North, Lambeth South, Streatham, and Merton
Archdeaconry of Wandsworth
includes deaneries of Battersea, Kingston, Richmond and Barnes, Tooting, and Wandsworth
Woolwich Episcopal Area (overseen by the area Bishop of Woolwich)
Archdeaconry of Lewisham & Greenwich
includes deaneries of Charlton, Deptford, East Lewisham, Eltham and Mottingham, Plumstead, and West Lewisham
Archdeaconry of Southwark
includes deaneries of Bermondsey, Camberwell, Dulwich, and Southwark and Newington

In other ecclesiastical use, although having lost religious orders in the English Reformation, the diocese has the London home of the Archbishop of Canterbury and records centre of the Church of England in the diocese, Lambeth Palace.

Bishops
Alongside the diocesan Bishop of Southwark (Christopher Chessun), the diocese has three area (suffragan) bishops: Karowei Dorgu, area Bishop of Woolwich; Rosemarie Mallett, area Bishop of Croydon; and Martin Gainsborough, area Bishop of Kingston. Since 1994 the Bishop of Fulham (currently Jonathan Baker, since 2013) has provided 'alternative episcopal oversight' in the diocese (along with those of London and Rochester) to those parishes which reject the ordination of women to the priesthood. Baker is licensed as an honorary assistant bishop in Southwark diocese in order to facilitate his ministry there.

Several other bishops are licensed as honorary assistant bishops in the diocese:
2004–present: Michael Doe, Preacher to Gray's Inn, former General Secretary of USPG and former Bishop suffragan of Swindon, lives in Woolwich.
2006–present: Richard Harries, Baron Harries of Pentregarth, is an honorary professor of theology at King's College London, former Gresham Professor of Divinity and former Bishop of Oxford.
2009–present: David Atkinson, former Bishop suffragan of Thetford, lives in South Croydon.
2011–present: Alan Chesters, retired diocesan Bishop of Blackburn, lives in Lingfield, Surrey (he is also licensed in Sussex and in Europe).
2011–present: Peter Selby, a visiting professor at King's College London and retired Bishop of Worcester, Bishop to Prisons and suffragan (later area) Bishop of Kingston, lives in Sydenham.
2013–present: The Archbishop of Canterbury's chief of staff, Nigel Stock, Bishop at Lambeth, Bishop to the Forces and Bishop for the Falkland Islands, lives in Lambeth.
2014–present: Stephen Platten, Rector of St Michael Cornhill (Diocese of London) and retired Bishop of Wakefield (also in London and Newcastle dioceses).
2021–present: Rob Gillion, Vicar of Streatham Christ Church and Associate Bishop for the Arts (honorary assistant bishop), is a former Bishop of Riverina

Churches

Outside deanery structures 
Cathedral of St Saviour & St Mary Overie, Southwark

Archdeaconry of Croydon

Deanery of Croydon Addington

Deanery of Croydon Central

Deanery of Croydon North

Deanery of Croydon South

Archdeaconry of Lambeth

Deanery of Lambeth North

Deanery of Lambeth South

Deanery of Merton

Archdeaconry of Lewisham and Greenwich 
Deanery of Charlton: Blackheath St John the Evangelist, Blackheath Park (St Michael & All Angels), Charlton St Luke, Charlton St Thomas, East Greenwich (Christ Church), Greenwich (St Alfege), Greenwich Peninsula (Holy Trinity), Kidbrooke St James, Kidbrooke St Nicholas, Westcombe Park (St George), Woolwich (St Mary Magdalene)

Deanery of Deptford: Blackheath Ascension, Brockley (St Peter), Deptford Holy Trinity, Deptford St John, Deptford St Luke, Deptford St Nicholas, Deptford St Paul, Hatcham St Catherine, Hatcham St James, Hatcham St Michael, Hatcham Park (All Saints)

Deanery of Eltham & Mottingham: Eltham Holy Trinity, Eltham St Barnabas, Eltham St John the Baptist, Eltham St Saviour, Eltham Park (St Luke), Mottingham St Alban, Mottingham St Andrew, Mottingham St Edward the Confessor, New Eltham (All Saints)

Deanery of Lewisham East: Bellingham (St Dunstan), Blackheath All Saints, Catford St Andrew the Apostle, Catford St John, Catford St Laurence, Downham St Barnabas, Downham St Luke, Grove Park (St Augustine), Hither Green (St Swithun), Lee Good Shepherd, Lee St Margaret, Lee St Mildred, Lee St Peter, Lewisham St Mary the Virgin, Lewisham St Stephen, North Downham (St Mark)

Deanery of Lewisham West: Brockley Hill (St Saviour), Crofton Park (St Hilda), Honor Oak Park (St Augustine of Canterbury), Lower Sydenham (St Michael & All Angels), Perry Hill (St George), Sydenham All Saints, Sydenham Holy Trinity, Sydenham St Bartholomew, Sydenham St Philip the Apostle

Deanery of Plumstead: Abbey Wood St Michael & All Angels, Abbey Wood William Temple, East Wickham St Michael the Archangel, Plumstead Ascension, Plumstead St John the Baptist, Plumstead St Mark, Plumstead St Nicholas, Shooters Hill All Saints, Shooters Hill Christ Church, Thamesmead Church of the Cross, Thamesmead St Paul, Welling St Mary the Virgin

Archdeaconry of Reigate 
Deanery of Reigate: Betchworth (St Michael & All Angels), Brockham Green (Christ Church), Buckland (St Mary the Virgin), Charlwood (St Nicholas), Chipstead (St Margaret of Antioch), Gatton (St Andrew), Horley St Bartholomew, Horley St Francis, Horley St Wilfrid, Kingswood (St Andrew), Leigh (St Bartholomew), Lower Kingswood (Wisdom of God), Merstham (St Katharine), Redhill Holy Trinity, Redhill St John the Evangelist, Redhill St Matthew, Reigate St Luke, Reigate St Mark, Reigate St Mary Magdalene, Reigate St Philip, Reigate Heath Church, Reigate Mill Church, Salfords (Christ the King), Sidlow Bridge (Emmanuel), South Merstham (All Saints), Tadworth (Good Shepherd), Woodmansterne (St Peter)

Deanery of Sutton: Beddington (St Mary), Belmont (St John the Baptist), Benhilton (All Saints), Carshalton (All Saints), Carshalton Beeches (Good Shepherd), Cheam St Alban the Martyr, Cheam St Dunstan, Cheam St Oswald, Hackbridge and Beddington Corner All Saints, Roundshaw (St Paul), St Helier Bishop Andrewes, St Helier St Peter, South Beddington (St Michael & All Angels), Sutton Christ Church, Sutton St Barnabas, Sutton St Nicholas, Wallington Holy Trinity, Wallington Springfield Church, Wallington St Patrick, Worcester Park (Christ Church)

Deanery of Tandridge

Archdeaconry of Southwark

Deanery of Bermondsey 

Deanery of Camberwell: Camberwell St George, Camberwell St Giles, Camberwell St Luke, Camberwell St Matthew, Nunhead (St Antony), Peckham All Saints, Peckham Christ Church, Peckham St John, Peckham St Mary Magdalene

Deanery of Dulwich: Dulwich Christ's Chapel of God's Gift, Dulwich St Barnabas, Dulwich St Clement, East Dulwich St John the Evangelist, Herne Hill St Paul, Herne Hill St Saviour, North Dulwich St Faith, Peckham St Saviour, South Dulwich St Stephen

Deanery of Southwark and Newington: Bermondsey St Hugh, Camberwell St Michael & All Angels, Kennington Park (St Agnes), Newington St Mary, Newington St Paul, Southwark Christ Church, Southwark St George the Martyr, Southwark St Matthew, Walworth St Christopher, Walworth St John, Walworth St Peter

Archdeaconry of Wandsworth 
Deanery of Battersea: Battersea Christ Church, Battersea St George, Battersea St Luke, Battersea St Mary, Battersea St Peter, Battersea Park All Saints, Battersea Park St Saviour, Battersea Rise St Mark, Clapham Common (St Barnabas), Lavender Hill (Ascension), Wandsworth Common (St Michael)

Deanery of Kingston: Ham St Andrew, Hook (St Paul), Kingston upon Thames All Saints, Kingston upon Thames St John the Evangelist, Kingston upon Thames St Luke, Kingston upon Thames St Paul, Kingston Vale (St John the Baptist), Malden St James, Malden St John the Baptist, New Malden Christ Church, New Malden St John the Divine, Norbiton (St Peter), Surbiton St Andrew, Surbiton St Mark, Surbiton St Matthew, Surbiton Hill (Christ Church), Tolworth Emmanuel, Tolworth St George

Deanery of Richmond and Barnes: Barnes Holy Trinity, Barnes St Mary, Barnes St Michael & All Angels, East Sheen All Saints, East Sheen Christ Church, Ham St Richard, Kew St Anne, Kew St Luke, Kew St Philip & All Saints, Mortlake (St Mary the Virgin), Petersham (St Peter), Richmond Holy Trinity, Richmond St John the Divine, Richmond St Mary Magdalene, Richmond St Matthias

Deanery of Tooting: Balham (St Mary), Balham Hill (Ascension), Furzedown (St Paul), Streatham Park (St Alban), Summerstown (St Mary), Tooting All Saints, Tooting St Augustine, Tooting St Nicholas, Upper Tooting (Holy Trinity), Wandsworth Common (St Mary Magdalene), West Streatham (St James)

Deanery of Wandsworth: Ackroydon Community Church, Earlsfield St Andrew, Earlsfield St John the Divine, East Putney (St Stephen), Putney All Saints, Putney St Margaret, Putney St Mary, Roehampton (Holy Trinity), Southfields (St Barnabas), Wandsworth All Saints, Wandsworth Holy Trinity, Wandsworth St Anne, Wandsworth St Michael & All Angels, Wimbledon Park St Paul

See also
Roman Catholic Archdiocese of Southwark

References

External links
Diocesan website
Churches in the Diocese of Southwark ("A Church Near You" website)

 
1905 establishments in England
Christian organizations established in 1905
Southwark